General elections were held in East Germany on 17 October 1954. It was the second election to the Volkskammer, which had 466 deputies; due to the four-power status of the city of Berlin, the 66 deputies from East Berlin were indirectly appointed by the East Berlin magistrate.

As the country was a de facto one-party state, voters only had the option of approving or rejecting a single list of candidates from the National Front, dominated by the Communist Socialist Unity Party of Germany. The list received the approval of 99.46% of voters, with turnout reported to be 98.5%.

Results

References

1954 in East Germany
Elections in East Germany
1954 elections in Germany
East Germany
October 1954 events in Europe